HCS Bombay, later HMS Bombay and HMS Ceylon, was a teak-built fifth rate, 38-gun wooden warship built in the Bombay Dockyard for the Honourable East India Company (HEIC) and launched in 1793.  The Royal Navy purchased her in 1805 and renamed her HMS Bombay.  She served with the Royal Navy under that name until 1 July 1808, when she became HMS Ceylon. She was sold at Malta in 1857 and broken up in 1861.

East India Company service
A newspaper announced on Saturday 7 December 1793 that a " 32-gun frigate The Bombay has been built by the Bombay Presidency for the Company’s service. It will be commanded by Capt Pruin." She was built in the Bombay Dockyard and fitted out by public subscription. "She is a testament to Indian carpentry skill." By 1 April 1794 she was patrolling off Ceylon.

In January 1797 HCS Bombay was in Amboyna in Indonesia, under the command of Captain Charles Pickett. Pickett became unwell so the command of the ship was handed to Captain William Selby. In May Selby captured Gorontalo, also in Celebes. The following month he was delivering desperately needed rice to the nutmeg producing island of Banda. On 28th July HCS Bombay arrived back in Amboyna and was returned to the command of Captain Pickett.

In July 1803 the EIC appointed John Hayes captain. Taking his family aboard, he sailed HCS Bombay from Bombay to Calcutta, where they arrived on 11 August, and where his family established themselves. On the resumption of war with France the EIC appointed Hayes commodore of a small squadron consisting of Bombay, Mornington (22 guns), Teignmouth (16), and the armed vessel Castlereagh (16), and charged Hayes with protecting the trade routes in the Bay of Bengal and adjacent waters.

At some point, Hayes and Bombay sailed to Muckie, Sumatra, and captured the fort there. It had belonged to the EIC, but had been lost due to the "treachery of the Malays". After three days of bombardment by Bombay and Castlereagh, Hayes landed at the head of a party of seamen and took the fort and adjacent batteries, which the British dismantled. They also took off 67 guns and a quantity of stores.

Royal Navy service
Admiral Sir Edward Pellew bought Bombay in April 1805. Captain Hayes apparently initially remained in command of Bombay when she came into the Royal Navy as he was listed as her captain in June 1805, but he then left her almost immediately.  In April 1807 Captain William Jones Lye took command.

On 10 July 1807 she captured the French navy brig  some eight leagues off Little Andaman, after a chase of nine hours. Jaseur was armed with 12 guns and had a crew of 55 men under the command of a lieutenant de vaisseau. She had left Île de France on 15 April and had made no captures. The last distribution of the proceeds of the capture was made in August 1817.

On 11 July 1808 the Navy renamed her Ceylon.

In September 1808 Ceylons boats recaptured  after a chase of three days. Her captors sent Ganges into Calcutta.

On 17–18 September 1810 two French ships, the frigate Vénus and corvette Victor, captured Ceylon while she was under the command of Charles Gordon. Ceylon had 10 men killed and 31 wounded. On 3 December Ceylon was at the capture of Île de France.

In November 1811, Commander James Tomkinson (acting) became captain. Tomkinson sailed Bombay back to Britain; she arrived at Deptford on 8 May 1811. By 1812 she was in ordinary at Chatham.

Post-war
Ceylon was fitted as a troopship between May 1813 and February 1814, with Captain Arthur P. Hamilton commissioning her in November 1813. Captain Peter Rye may have preceded him in 1813. In August 1815 she accompanied the 74-gun , and the storeship  as Northumberland carried Napoleon into exile at Saint Helena. Ceylon was then laid up at Plymouth in May 1816.

Between 1817 and 1830 she was a troopship. She was fitted as a receiving ship between January and October 1832. Then in 1833 she became a receiving ship at Malta, and her armament was reduced to two guns.

From July 1838 to 1842 she was under the command of William Robert Mends. From March 1843 she was the flagship for Sir Lucius Curtis. Then in April 1846, Thomas Graves assumed command. In 1847 H.N.J. Chesshyre replaced Graves. Admiral Edward Harvey raised his flag in Ceylon in March 1848.  Joseph Sparkhall Rundle became captain from April 1850. His replacement, in December 1854 was C.G. Robinson. From 1853 to 1855 she was the flagship of the Admiral superintendent at Malta (Rear-Admiral Montagu Stopford and Admiral Houston Stewart during this period).

Fate
Ceylon was sold at Malta on 4 July 1857 for £900. She was broken up in 1861.

Notes, citations, and references
Notes

Citations

References

External links
William Loney, RN

Bombay
1793 ships
Captured ships
Ships of the British East India Company